Dev Raj Bhar is a member of 2nd Nepalese Constituent Assembly. He won Banke–1 seat in CA assembly, 2013 from Communist Party of Nepal (Unified Marxist–Leninist).

References

1952 births
Living people
People from Arghakhanchi District
Communist Party of Nepal (Unified Marxist–Leninist) politicians
Members of the 2nd Nepalese Constituent Assembly